In cricket, a player is said to have completed a century when they score 100 or more runs in a single innings. The Under-19 Cricket World Cup is the international championship of under-19 One Day International cricket, and is organised by the sport's governing body, the International Cricket Council (ICC). It was first held in 1988, and then 1998, since when it has been contested every two years. As of the 2020 edition, a total of 130 centuries have been scored by 115 players from 18 different teams. South African batsmen have scored the highest number of centuries (17). South Africa, along with Australia, also have the highest number of centurions (15). New Zealand and Scotland have conceded twelve centuries each, which is more than any other team. At least one century has been conceded by 26 of the participating teams.

The first century of the championship was scored by Brett Williams of Australia when he scored 112 runs against the West Indies in the 1988 Youth Cricket World Cup. Hasitha Boyagoda scored the highest innings of the championship in the 2018 edition, scoring 191 runs for Sri Lanka against Kenya. India's Shikhar Dhawan and England's Jack Burnham hold the record for the highest number of centuries (three), and are followed by eleven other players who have scored two centuries. Brendan Taylor of Zimbabwe, Anamul Haque of Bangladesh, Babar Azam of Pakistan, Eoin Morgan of Ireland, and Lendl Simmons of the West Indies are the only players to have scored centuries in more than one edition of the championship.

The highest number of centuries was scored in the 2018 edition (25), whereas the lowest number of centuries was scored in the 1988, 2000, and 2008 editions with three each. The highest number of centuries at a single ground has been scored at Lincoln No. 3, Lincoln, with nine centuries, followed by Bert Sutcliffe Oval in Lincoln and Khan Shaheb Osman Ali Stadium in Fatullah, with seven centuries each. Five centuries have been scored in World Cup finals, all of which have resulted in victories. They were scored by India's Unmukt Chand and Manjot Kalra, Australia's Brett Williams and Jarrad Burke, and England's Stephen Peters. Williams' 108 runs against Pakistan in the 1988 final remains the highest individual score in a final.

Key

Centuries

Notes

References

External links
 

ICC Under-19 Cricket World Cup
Under-19 Cricket World Cup centuries